Dognina veltini is a moth of the family Notodontidae. It has been recorded from Costa Rica south to Bolivia.

References

Moths described in 1890
Notodontidae